F-1 World Grand Prix, developed by Paradigm Entertainment, is a Formula One racing game/sim first released in 1998 for the Nintendo 64 game console and to later platforms including the Sega Dreamcast, Microsoft Windows, Sony PlayStation, and Game Boy Color. The Nintendo 64 version is based on the 1997 Formula One season, featuring each of the 17 circuits from the season and all 22 drivers (as well as two unlockable bonus racers), with the exceptions of Jacques Villeneuve (licensing reason) and the MasterCard Lola team (not recognised, as they did not take part in any races during the season).

The Dreamcast version (also known as F1 World Grand Prix) and Game Boy Color version are based on the 1998 Formula One season and the PlayStation (released as F1 World Grand Prix: 1999 Season) and Windows versions are based on the 1999 Formula One season. The Windows version itself is a sequel to the 1999 video game Official Formula One Racing.

Gameplay 
The game consists of five gameplay modes: Grand Prix, a course-by-course simulation of the 1997 season; Exhibition, a single race; Time Trial, a race against the clock and Challenge, which comprised real scenarios from the 1997 season-examples include trying to win the 1997 Hungarian Grand Prix as Damon Hill or beating Jean Alesi as David Coulthard in the 1997 Italian Grand Prix. The final mode allowed 2 players to compete in a single, split-screen race.

F-1 World Grand Prix offered a fairly realistic experience for its time. Prior to races, it allowed for the fine-tuning of the player's car, including tyre tread, amount of fuel and wing angle. The cars themselves followed realistic simulated physics and were at risk of damage and wear like their real-life counterparts. Weather (and its effects) was also simulated. Visually, the game offered the same trademark appearance of live F1 coverage, and aimed to have a photo-realistic appeal.

F-1 World Grand Prix was highly acclaimed by most critics, more so than its sequel F-1 World Grand Prix II, which many felt lacked a sufficient number of improvements over the original.

Due to copyright issues, Williams F1 driver Jacques Villeneuve is not featured in the game and in his place is a silhouette of his body, a fictional helmet design is used and his name is simply Driver Williams. However, his career statistics are correct. This character's name could be customized by the player, either to personalise their driver or to unlock certain extras, such as the Silver and Gold racers, as well as a fictional Hawaiian circuit.

Reception

Video System version (1998) 

The Nintendo 64 and Dreamcast versions received favorable reviews according to the Review aggregation website GameRankings. N64 Magazines James Ashton said that the N64 version was "the finest driving simulation the world has ever seen". Peter Jankulovski of Hyper game the same console version 86%, calling it "a great addition to any racing fan's game library". Game Informer gave the Dreamcast version a positive review, a few months before its U.S. release date. Greg Orlando of NextGen said of the same console version in his early review as a finest title on Dreamcast, but considered as demanding for the casual gamer. In Japan, Famitsu gave it a score of 30 out of 40 for the latter console version, and 29 out of 40 for the former.

Edge gave the N64 original eight out of ten and later to the Dreamcast version seven out of ten.

At the 1999 Milia festival in Cannes, the N64 version took home a "Gold" prize for revenues above €20 million in the European Union during the previous year.

Eidos Interactive version (1999) 

The Eidos Interactive version received mixed or average reviews according to GameRankings. AllGame gave the PlayStation version four stars out of five, praising the game's extras such as a fully customizable instant replay.

Sequel 
Its Video System sequel, F-1 World Grand Prix II, was released in 1999 for the Nintendo 64 and in 2000 for the Dreamcast and Game Boy Color.

References

External links 
Official Nintendo Japan F-1 World Grand Prix site

1998 video games
Dreamcast games
Eidos Interactive games
Formula One video games
Game Boy Color games
Nintendo 64 games
PlayStation (console) games
Sega video games
Split-screen multiplayer games
Video games developed in the United States
Video System games
Windows games
Video games set in Argentina
Video games set in Australia
Video games set in Austria
Video games set in Belgium
Video games set in Brazil
Video games set in Canada
Video games set in France
Video games set in Germany
Video games set in Hungary
Sports video games set in Italy
Video games set in Japan
Video games set in Monaco
Video games set in Spain
Video games set in the United Kingdom
Lankhor games
Multiplayer and single-player video games
Paradigm Entertainment games